In mathematics, the Golomb–Dickman constant arises in the theory of random permutations and in number theory. Its value is

 

It is not known whether this constant is rational or irrational.

Definitions 
Let an be the average — taken over all permutations of a set of size n — of the length of the longest cycle in each permutation.  Then the Golomb–Dickman constant is

 

In the language of probability theory,  is asymptotically the expected length of the longest cycle in a uniformly distributed random permutation of a set of size n.

In number theory, the Golomb–Dickman constant appears in connection with the average size of the largest prime factor of an integer. More precisely,

where  is the largest prime factor of k  . So if k is a d digit integer, then  is the asymptotic average number of digits of the largest prime factor of k.

The Golomb–Dickman constant appears in number theory in a different way.   What is the
probability that second largest prime factor of n is smaller than the square root of the largest prime factor of n?
More precisely,

where  is the second largest prime factor n.

The Golomb-Dickman constant also arises when we consider the average length of the largest cycle of any function from a finite set to itself.   If X is a finite set, if we repeatedly apply a function f: X → X to any element x of this set, it eventually enters a cycle, meaning that for some k we have  for sufficiently large n; the smallest k with this property is the length of the cycle. Let bn be the average, taken over all functions from a set of size n to itself, of the length of the largest cycle.  Then Purdom and Williams proved that

Formulae 

These include:

where  is the logarithmic integral,

where  is the exponential integral, and

and

where  is the Dickman function.

See also 
 Random permutation
 Random permutation statistics

External links

References

Mathematical constants
Permutations